The Drift is the thirteenth studio album by American solo artist Scott Walker, released on 8 May 2006 on 4AD. Apart from composing the soundtrack to the film Pola X, the album was Walker's first studio album in eleven years and only his third studio album since the final disbanding of The Walker Brothers in 1978. Walker composed the songs for the album slowly over the decade after the release of 1995's Tilt, beginning with "Cue" (the longest song to complete), up until the album's recording. An early version of "Psoriatic" was premiered at the Meltdown festival on 17 June 2000 under the title "Thimble Rigging".

The album was recorded over a period of 17 months at Metropolis Studios in Chiswick, London, with orchestra recorded in one day at George Martin's AIR Studios in Hampstead, London. Receiving positive reviews from critics before its release, the album was released as an LP and CD in May 2006. The artwork for the album was designed by Vaughan Oliver at v23 with assistance from Chris Bigg and photography by Marc Atkins.

Overview
Walker's first album composed entirely of new material since 1995's Tilt, The Drift forms the second installment of the "trilogy" that concluded with 2012's Bish Bosch. In the years between Tilt and The Drift, Walker's released output comprised a few instrumental tracks on the soundtrack to the film Pola X, a cover of Bob Dylan's "I Threw It All Away" on the To Have and to Hold soundtrack, and "Only Myself to Blame" from The World Is Not Enough soundtrack, as well as a few compilations of previously released material, including the retrospective box set 5 Easy Pieces.

The Drift has been cited by many critics and fans alike as a disturbing and complex album that departs from Scott Walker's previous albums while still remaining true to his experimental roots. French singer Vanessa Contenay-Quinones appears as the voice of Clara Petacci on "Clara".

The sound and subject matter for the album is unrelentingly dark and unsettling, often juxtaposing quiet sections with sudden loud noise to induce discomfort in the listener. Subjects include torture, disease, 9/11, Elvis Presley (and his stillborn twin brother Jesse Garon Presley), and the Srebrenica massacre.

Track listing

Personnel 
 Scott Walker – vocals, guitar, harmonica, saxophone, sound treatment
 Hugh Burns – guitar
 Ian Thomas – drums
 Mark Warman – keyboards, orchestration, conducting, percussion, woodwinds, sound treatment
 Philip Sheppard – orchestration, conducting, cello
 Alasdair Malloy – percussion, drums
 John Giblin – bass
 Steve Pearce – bass
 Peter Walsh – sound treatment, sitar guitar, percussion
 Andrew Cronshaw – woodwinds, concertina
 James Stevenson – guitar
 Brian Gascoigne – keyboards, sound treatment
 Thomas Bowes – violin
 Vanessa Contenay-Quinones – vocals
 Beverly Foster – voice
 Pete Long – saxophone
 Rohan Onraet – percussion
 Lucy Painter – vocals
 Rebecca Painter – vocals
 Ralph Warman – vocals
 Derek Watkins – flugelhorn
|

Production
Produced by Scott Walker & Peter Walsh
Engineers: Geoff Foster, Peter Walsh
Mixing: Peter Walsh

Release history

Charts

References

External links

The Drift at the official 4AD site. Also "Jesse" video
Album completion announcement at the official 4AD site.
"Horrorpop!" - Momus writes about The Drift.
Dan Warburton on The Drift

2006 albums
4AD albums
Cultural depictions of Benito Mussolini
Scott Walker (singer) albums
Albums produced by Peter Walsh
Albums recorded at AIR Studios